Prosenjit Chatterjee (born 30 September 1961) is an Indian actor and producer. He is widely regarded as one of the leading actors in modern Bengali cinema. He predominantly works in Bengali cinema . He is the son of veteran Bollywood actor Biswajit Chatterjee. He began his acting career as a child actor in Hrishikesh Mukherjee's Chotto Jigyasa, for which he won the Bengal Film Journalists' Association – Most Outstanding Work of the Year Award. Following this he appeared in other films as a child actor. But unable to concentrate on his studies, Prosenjit took a break from acting and returned after completing his graduation from Xavier's University and his first leading role came through Bimal Roy's Duti Pata.

Prosenjit's breakthrough role came opposite Vijeta Pandit in Amar Sangi (1987), a highly successful romantic drama directed by Sujit Guha. He made his debut in Hindi cinema with David Dhawan directed Aandhiyan (1990). Apart from appearing in a series of masala films, he started doing middle-of-the-road cinema with Chokher Bali which starred Aishwarya Rai Bachchan in her debut Bengali film and which met with critical and commercial success upon release. He again came back in doing commercial films and in 2006, he again collaborated with Rituparno Ghosh for Dosar and received the Best Actor Award and National Film Award - Special Jury Award / Special Mention (Feature Film) for his performance in the film.

In 2009, Prosenjit did once again collaborate with Ghosh for Shob Charitro Kalponik, which starred Bipasha Basu in her Bengali debut, won the National Film Award for Best Feature Film in Bengali. In 2010, Prosenjit got another breakthrough by portraying the lead character of Arun Chatterjee in debutant Srijit Mukherji's Autograph, for which he was nominated at MIAAC (Mahindra Indo-American Arts Council) film festival, under the Best Actor category. He portrayed the role of Lalon, a noted spiritual leader, poet and folk singer of Bengal in the 19th century in Goutam Ghose directorial Moner Manush and Anthony Firingee in the National Film Awards winning film, Jaatishwar. He went to earn further recognition and wider appeal for his roles in the romantic thriller Khawto, the drama Praktan, the thriller Traffic, the drama Shankhachil, the crime film Zulfiqar and have committed to star in the Hindi films 3 Dev, alongside Kay Kay Menon, Raima Sen, Karan Singh Grover and Tabeer alongside Neeraj Kabi.

Chatterjee produced the Ghosh scripted the television series Gaaner Oparey, which launched the careers of brothers Arjun Chakraborty and Gaurav Chakraborty and Mimi Chakraborty as well. In 2016, he debuted on the non-fiction category of television with a 97-episode mini-series, titled Mahanayak. Produced by Shree Venkatesh Films and directed by Birsa Dasgupta, the show starred Paoli Dam, Tanushree Chakraborty and Priyanka Sarkar in other pivotal roles and was based on the life of a superstar of the 60s era — a life fraught with career highs and personal turbulences.

Personal life
Prosenjit lives in Kolkata with his wife, actress Arpita Pal and their son Trishanjit.

He has had two previous marriages with Debashree Roy and Aparna Guhathakurta. Prosenjit and Aparna have a daughter together, Prerona Chatterjee. In 2015, Prosenjit bought a Cricket Team in Bengal Celebrity League named Purulia Panthers.

Film career
He made his debut as a protagonist with Bimal Roy's Duti Pata (1983), a teenage romance along the lines of Bobby. Amar Sangi (1987) opposite Vijayeta Pandit, Apon Amaar Apon (1990) directed by Tarun Majumdar and Buddhadeb Dasgupta's Ami, Yasin Ar Amar Madhubala (2007) are three important films of his career. The song "Chirodini Tumi Je Amar" from Amar Sangi became a cult hit. Satabdi Roy has acted with him in more than 50 films. He has done 35 films with Rachana Banerjee, 50 with Rituparna Sengupta, around 16 with Indrani Haldar and four with his wife Arpita Pal. Prosenjit debuted in Bollywood in 1990 with the David Dhawan directed Aandhiyan where he played the role of Mumtaz's son. After working in commercial films, Chatterjee started debuted in Parallel Cinema with Rituparno Ghosh's Chokher Bali (film) and since then have appeared in numerous art films, including Dosar, Jaatishwar, Shankhachil, Shob Charitro Kalponik. Chatterjee returned to Hindi cinema by playing the role of lead protagonist in Mehul Kumar directed Meet Mere Man Ke (1991) alongside Ayesha Jhulka, Feroz Khan and Salma Agha. His other Bollywood films are Sone Ki Zanjeer, Veerta, Shanghai and more recently Traffic which received critical acclaim upon release. One of the most important works of Prosenjit is as Arun Chatterjee in Srijit Mukherji's Autograph. His first ever produced film Bapi Bari Jaa was released on 7 December 2012.

Awards and honours

Filmography

Television

References

External links

 
 

Indian male film actors
Living people
Male actors from Kolkata
Bengali male actors
Male actors in Bengali cinema
Bengal Film Journalists' Association Award winners
1962 births
Kalakar Awards winners
20th-century Indian male actors
21st-century Indian male actors
Film producers from Kolkata
Bengali film producers
Special Mention (feature film) National Film Award winners
University of Calcutta alumni